Ilfracombe is a town on the North Devon coast.  This is a list of notable individuals who are associated with Ilfracombe in some way, listed alphabetically within categories.

Academics

Thomas Harriot – the quintessential Renaissance Scholar, who in September 1607 observed a comet from Ilfracombe which would later be identified as Halley's Comet.

Actors/Actresses

Peter Sellers – where he first set foot on stage
Joan and Jackie Collins – who went to school in the town

Architects

George Wightwick – designer of Watermouth Castle

Artists

Damien Hirst – local patron, funder of the No 11 the Quay restaurant, also a new restaurant number 9 the Quay, and various properties and farms in the town
Frank McEwen – OBE, Founder and Director of National Gallery of Rhodesia. Retired to Ilfracombe before his death.
 George Shaw – Turner prize shortlisted, artist has studio on Ilfracombe High St

Explorers

Thomas Stukley – an English adventurer who served in combat in France, Ireland, and at the Battle of Lepanto, raised the son of Sir Hugh Stucley, of Afheton, near Ilfracombe 
Captained many R N first ships of the line, incl HMS Dreadnought, HMS Argot, nicknamed "Defender of Madeira". Rose through ranks to become rear-admiral, commanded fleet which rescued the British army from Corunna during the Napoleonic war.
Richard Bowen (1761–1797) – British naval officer, brother of Rear-Admiral James Bowen. He served with Lord Nelson and whilst standing next to Admiral Nelson was killed during the Battle of Santa Cruz de Tenerife.
John Bowen (1780–1823) – a naval officer and colonial administrator born in Ilfracombe 1780, founded first British settlement of Tasmania 1803 at Risdon cove (renamed Hobart), died Ilfracombe 1827. Married the niece of the Duchess of Clarence.
 Captain John Richards Lapenotière (1770–19 January 1834) – born in Ilfracombe, was a British Royal Navy officer who, as a young lieutenant commanding the tiny topsail schooner HMS Pickle, observed the Battle of Trafalgar on  21 October 1805, participated in the rescue operations which followed it and then carried the dispatches of the victory and the death of Admiral Nelson to Britain.

Journalists and broadcasters

Lady Emilia Frances Strong Dilke (1840–1904) – English author, born at Ilfracombe.  She became a contributor to the Saturday Review in 1864 and subsequently was for many years fine-art critic of the Academy.

Musicians

 John Twiname Gardner G.P – composer and conductor of Ilfracombe Choral Society
 John Gardner – composer

Politicians

Anna Catherine Parnell – Irish nationalist who drowned in the town; sister of Charles Stewart Parnell

Sportsmen/women

Jonathan Edwards – world champion triple jump athlete, whose father was the vicar at "Pip and Jim's" church.
Jason Twist – two times world champion at eight ball pool.

Writers
Robert Freke Gould (1836-1915) – soldier, barrister and historian of Freemasonry
Emily Francis Strong – British amateur author and art historian, popular writer on art, particularly French, born in Ilfracombe in 1840.
Henry Williamson(1 December 1895 – 13 August 1977) – prolific English author known for his natural and social history novels. He lived in a small cottage in the town.
Coulson Kernahan (1858–1943) – English novelist born at Ilfracombe.
James Allen (28 November 1864 – 1912) – writer of inspirational books and poetry. At age 38, he retired from employment and he and his wife moved to a small cottage in Ilfracombe to pursue a simple life of contemplation. There he wrote for 9 years producing over 20 works.
Philip James Bailey (22 April 1816 – 6 September 1902) – Ilfracombe was once home to this English poet and author of Festus.
Lady Emilia Frances Strong Dilke (1840–1904) – English author, born at Ilfracombe.  She became a contributor to the Saturday Review in 1864 and subsequently was for many years fine-art critic of the Academy.

References

Ilfracombe